The third season of the television comedy series Mike & Molly began airing on September 24, 2012 on CBS in the United States. The season is produced by Chuck Lorre Productions and Warner Bros. Television, with series creator Mark Roberts serving as executive producer along with Chuck Lorre and Don Foster. On March 14, 2012, CBS renewed Mike & Molly for a third season.

The series focuses on the title characters Mike Biggs (Billy Gardell) and Molly Flynn (Melissa McCarthy), a couple who meet at an Overeaters Anonymous meeting in Chicago, Illinois. After Molly, a primary-school teacher, invites police officer Mike to give a talk to her class, they begin dating. Mike and Molly live in the home of Molly's mother Joyce (Swoosie Kurtz) and sister Victoria (Katy Mixon). Joyce is in an on-off relationship with widower Vince Moranto (Louis Mustillo), who is often seen at the house. Mike is regularly kept company by his best friend and partner in the police force, Carl McMillan (Reno Wilson). Other prominent characters in the series include Carl's grandmother Rosetta (Cleo King); Mike's mother Peggy (Rondi Reed) and cafe worker Samuel (Nyambi Nyambi). David Anthony Higgins, who plays the role of Harry, was upgraded to series regular status for this season. Season three of Mike & Molly was broadcast in the United States on Mondays at 9:30 P.M. following 2 Broke Girls.

Cast

Main
 Billy Gardell as Mike Biggs (23 episodes)
 Melissa McCarthy as Molly Flynn (23 episodes)
 Reno Wilson as Carl McMillan (23 episodes)
 Katy Mixon as Victoria Flynn (23 episodes)
 Nyambi Nyambi as Samuel (22 episodes)
 Rondi Reed as Peggy Biggs (8 episodes)
 Cleo King as Rosetta McMillan 'Nana' (7 episodes)
 Louis Mustillo as Vince Moranto (21 episodes)
 David Anthony Higgins as Harry (6 episodes)
 Swoosie Kurtz as Joyce Flynn (23 episodes)

Recurring and guest appearances
 Gerald McRaney as Captain Patrick
 Holly Robinson Peete as Christina
 Reginald VelJohnson as Brother Heywood
 Matt Battaglia as Rob
 LaMonica Garrett as James
 Elizabeth Sung as Tammy
 Jon Polito as Frankie
 Lamont Thompson as Andre
 Dave "Gruber" Allen as Tom
 Brendan Patrick Connor as George
 Justin Lawrence as Mark
 Marianne Muellerleile as Connie
 Cheryl Hawker as Lynette
 Nosheen Phoenix as Shyama
 Tim Conway as Brian
 Josh Braaten as David
 Jim Beaver as Dwight

Episodes

Ratings

References

External links
Episode recaps at CBS.com
List of Mike & Molly season 3 episodes at Internet Movie Database

2012 American television seasons
2013 American television seasons
Mike & Molly